The ngultrum (symbol: Nu., code: BTN) is the currency of the Kingdom of Bhutan. It can be literally translated as 'silver' for ngul and 'coin' for trum. It is subdivided into 100 chhertum (spelled as chetrums on coins until 1979). The Royal Monetary Authority of Bhutan, the central bank of Bhutan is the minting authority of the ngultrum banknotes and coins. The ngultrum is currently pegged to the Indian rupee at parity.

History

Until 1789, the coins of the Cooch Behar mint circulated in Bhutan. Following this, Bhutan began issuing its own coins known as chetrum, mostly silver  rupees. Hammered silver and copper coins were the only types issued until 1929, when modern style silver  rupee coins were introduced, followed by bronze 1 paisa in 1931 (dated 1928). Nickel  rupee coins were introduced in 1950. While the Cooch Behar mint coins circulated alongside Bhutan's own coins, decimalization was introduced in 1957, when Bhutan's first issue of coins denominated in naya paisa. The 1966 issues were 25 naya paisa, 50 naya paisa and 1 rupee coins, struck in cupro-nickel.

While the Bhutanese government developed its economy in the early 1960s, monetization in 1968 led to the establishment of the Bank of Bhutan. As monetary reforms took place in 1974, the Ngultrum was officially introduced as 100 Chhetrum equal to 1 Ngultrum. The Ngultrum retained the peg to the Indian rupee at par, which the Bhutanese coins had maintained.

The term derives from the Dzongkha ngul, "silver" and trum, a Hindi loanword meaning "money."

The Ministry of Finance issued its first banknotes in 1974 in denominations of Nu.1, Nu.5, Nu.10 and Nu.100. This was followed by the establishment of the Royal Monetary Authority of Bhutan as the central bank of Bhutan in 1982, which took over the authority to issue banknotes in 1983, replacing the authority of the Ministry of Finance.

Coins
In 1974, aluminum Ch.5 and Ch.10, aluminium-bronze Ch.20, and cupro-nickel Ch.25 and Nu.1 were introduced. The Ch.5 was square and the Ch.10 was scallop-shaped. A new coinage was introduced in 1979, consisting of bronze Ch.5 and Ch.10, and cupro-nickel Ch.25 and Ch.50 and Nu.1 and Nu.3. Aluminium-bronze Ch.25 was also issued dated 1979. Ch.5 and Ch.10 have largely ceased circulating. Currently, coins are available in denominations of Ch.20, Ch.25, Ch.50 and Nu.1.

Banknotes

Previous series
On June 2, 1974, Nu.1, Nu.5 and Nu.10 notes were introduced by the Royal Government of Bhutan, followed by Nu.2, Nu.20, Nu.50, and Nu.100 in 1978. On August 4, 1982, the Royal Monetary Authority of Bhutan Act was enacted, although the RMA did not begin operations until November 1, 1983, and did not issue its own family of notes until 1986.

Present series

In 2006, the Monetary Authority introduced its latest series of notes, with denominations of Nu.1, Nu.5, Nu.10, Nu.20, Nu.50, Nu.100, Nu.500, and Nu.1000. These notes use a hybrid substrate.

Commemorative notes

Exchange rate

See also
 Royal Monetary Authority of Bhutan
 Economy of Bhutan

References

Panish, Charles K: "Early Coinage of Bhutan". The American Numismatic Society, Museum Notes 17, New York 1971, p. 247-254 and plates XLVII-XLVIII.
Rhodes, Nicholas:The Coinage of Bhutan. Oriental Numismatic Society, Information Sheet no 16, January 1977.
Rhodes, Nicholas: "Coinage in Bhutan".Journal of Bhutan Studies.. The Centre of Bhutan Studies, vol. 1, no. 1, Thimphu, Autumn, 1999, p. 84-113.
Rhodes, Nicholas: "The Monetisation of Bhutan". Journal of Bhutan Studies.. The Centre of Bhutan Studies, vol. 2, no. 1, Thimphu, Winter 2000, p. 85-103.

External links
 Analysis of Pegged Exchange Rate Between Bhutan and India
 Bhutan Currecy & Banks in Bhutan

Historical and current banknotes of Bhutan
 http://himalaya.socanth.cam.ac.uk/collections/journals/jbs/pdf/JBS_01_01_04.pdf
 http://himalaya.socanth.cam.ac.uk/collections/journals/jbs/pdf/JBS_02_02_03.pdf
 https://web.archive.org/web/20120806142959/http://picasaweb.google.com/Vercrusse/Bhutan_Coins02

Economy of Bhutan
Fixed exchange rate
Currencies of Bhutan
Currencies introduced in 1974